Savage Genius (stylized as savage genius) is a Japanese band signed to Victor Entertainment. Since 2008,  has stayed as the only member of the band.

History
The duo Aa (vocals and lyricist) and Takumi (composer/arranger, producer) started as a songwriting group in the live music scene in Kobe. They debuted in the 2001 AXIA Artist Audition, and signed with Warner Music Japan, cutting two singles.

In 2004 they signed with Victor Entertainment, where they continue to release songs, many of which are anime theme songs.

On the 30th of November 2007, it was announced that one of the group's members, Takumi, had retired.

Discography
Note: All song lyrics by Aa, all music composed by Takumi unless otherwise noted.

Singles

Albums
 (July 5, 2006) #41
 (November 7, 2007) #71

First Smile (October 20, 2010)

References

External links
  savage genius official website
 

Japanese pop music groups
Japanese musical duos
Musical groups from Hyōgo Prefecture
Anime musicians